The BC Premier's Handicap is a Canadian Thoroughbred horse race run annually at Hastings Racecourse in Vancouver, British Columbia. Held in October, it is open to horses aged three and older.

The BC Premier's Handicap was first run in 1946 and was elevated to Grade III status in 1973.

Records
Speed  record:
 2:15.00 - Stop The Blue (1993)

Most wins:
 2 - Pursuit (1954, 1955)
 2 - Blue Hawk (1961, 1962)
 2 - Ky Alta (1980, 1981)
 2 - Travelling Victor (1983, 1985)
 2 - Irish Bear (1987, 1988)
 2 - Haveigotadealforu (1990, 1991)
 2 - Commander (2012, 2013)
 2 - Killin Me Smalls (2015, 2016)

Most wins by a jockey:
 5 - Samuel Krasner (1977, 1984, 1989, 1992, 1996)

Most wins by a trainer:
 5 - David V. Forster (1978, 1982, 1994, 2004, 2010)

Winners since 1991

Earlier winners 

1946 - Mouse Hole
1947 - Minstrel Boy
1948 - Sir Berrill
1949 - 
1950 - 
1951 - 
1952 - 
1953 - Ocean Mist
1954 - Pursuit
1955 - Pursuit
1956 - Postillion
1957 - 
1958 - Mr John D
1959 - Desert Fire
1960 - Gigantic
1961 - Blue Hawk
1962 - Blue Hawk
1963 - Ky Miracle
1964 - McGregor Glen
1965 - Costa Rica
1966 - Craig D
1967 - Flying Magic
1968 - Regal Jingle
1969 - Haigs Task
1970 - Charlie Cheri
1971 - Shadows Dividend
1972 - Love Your Host
1973 - Coral Isle
1974 - Ceio Me
1975 - Blue Thumb
1976 - Pampas Host
1977 - Smiley's Dream
1978 - First Purchase
1979 - Pole Position
1980 - Ky Alta
1981 - Ky Alta
1982 - Hafa Adai
1983 - Travelling Victor
1984 - Social Round
1985 - Travelling Victor
1986 - Fortinbras
1987 - Irish Bear
1988 - Irish Bear
1989 - Charlie Chalmers

See also
 List of Canadian flat horse races

References

Graded stakes races in Canada
Recurring sporting events established in 1946
1946 establishments in British Columbia
Sport in Vancouver